Gunnar Persson is a retired Swedish footballer. Persson made 57 Allsvenskan appearances for Djurgården and scored no goals.

References

Swedish footballers
Djurgårdens IF Fotboll players
Association footballers not categorized by position
Year of birth missing